Uroš Spajić (born 13 February 1993) is a Serbian professional footballer who plays as a center back for Red Star Belgrade.

Club career

Red Star Belgrade
Spajić made his professional debut for Red Star Belgrade on 27 October 2010 in a Serbian Cup match against Borac Čačak. He was subsequently loaned to Red Star's farm team Sopot in the Serbian third tier, where he played the 2011–12 season. In his final season at Red Star, he appeared in 16 games and became recognized as a player with remarkable qualities.

Toulouse
On 29 May 2013, Red Star Belgrade and Toulouse FC agreed on Spajić's transfer to the French side for €1.5 million. Spajić made his Toulouse debut against Valenciennes on the opening day of the 2013–14 season; after Steeve Yago committed a foul to concede a penalty, the uninvolved Spajić was sent off in an apparent case of mistaken identity.

Anderlecht
On 31 August 2016, Spajić joined Belgian club Anderlecht on a season-long loan deal. The deal was made permanent near the end of the 2016-17 season.

Krasnodar
On 26 May 2018, he signed a 5-year contract with the Russian Premier League side FC Krasnodar. Before the 2020–21 season, a new limit of 8 foreign players in a squad was introduced by the Russian Premier League. Spajić did not appear for Krasnodar in 2020 up to that point due to injury, and he was not registered with the league for the season. On 21 January 2022, his contract with Krasnodar was terminated by mutual consent.

Feyenoord
On 15 September 2020 he joined Feyenoord on loan for the remainder of the season. He made his debut for the club on 4 October 2020 by starting in the away game against Willem II, a match which was won 1–4.

Kasımpaşa 
On 31 January 2022, Spajić joined Turkish club Kasımpaşa. In April 2022, he injured his knee ligaments, and missed the rest of the season and the World Cup 2022. He left the club at the end of the season.

Red Star Belgrade 
In December 2022, he signed a three year deal with his home club, Red Star Belgrade.

International career
Spajić first played for Serbia's U21 team in a friendly with Israel U21 on 6 February 2013. He played all three group matches for the team at the 2015 UEFA Under-21 Championship.

He made his debut for the Serbian national team on 4 September 2015 in a EURO 2016 qualifier against Armenia which Serbia won 2–0. 

In June 2018 he was selected in Serbia's squad for the 2018 World Cup, but he failed to make any appearances there.

Career statistics

Club

International

Honours
Anderlecht
 Belgian League: 2016–17
 Belgian Super Cup: 2017

References

External links
 
 
 

1993 births
Living people
Footballers from Belgrade
Association football defenders
Serbian footballers
Serbia international footballers
Serbia under-21 international footballers
Serbia youth international footballers
2018 FIFA World Cup players
Red Star Belgrade footballers
FK Sopot players
Toulouse FC players
R.S.C. Anderlecht players
FC Krasnodar players
Feyenoord players
Kasımpaşa S.K. footballers
Serbian SuperLiga players
Ligue 1 players
Belgian Pro League players
Russian Premier League players
Eredivisie players
Süper Lig players
Serbian expatriate footballers
Serbian expatriate sportspeople in France
Serbian expatriate sportspeople in Belgium
Serbian expatriate sportspeople in Russia
Serbian expatriate sportspeople in the Netherlands
Serbian expatriate sportspeople in Turkey
Expatriate footballers in France
Expatriate footballers in Belgium
Expatriate footballers in Russia
Expatriate footballers in the Netherlands
Expatriate footballers in Turkey